Football Club Aurillac Arpajon Cantal Auvergne (formerly Aurillac Foot Cantal Auvergne) is a French association football team founded in 1953. It is based in Aurillac, Cantal, France and is playing in the sixth tier of French football. It plays at the Stade de Baradel which has a capacity of 3,000. In 2013 the club adopted the current name after a merger with ES Arpajon.

References

External links
  

1953 establishments in France
Association football clubs established in 1953
Sport in Cantal
Football clubs in Auvergne-Rhône-Alpes